Frank Raymond Domayo (born 16 February 1993) is a Tanzanian football player. He plays for Azam.

International
He made his Tanzania national football team debut on 26 May 2012 in a friendly against Malawi.

He was selected for the 2019 Africa Cup of Nations squad.

References

External links
 
 

1993 births
People from Dar es Salaam
Living people
Tanzanian footballers
Tanzania international footballers
Association football midfielders
Young Africans S.C. players
Azam F.C. players
2019 Africa Cup of Nations players
Tanzanian Premier League players